Major General Hugo Adolf Magnus Christoffer Gadd (13 March 1885 – 13 December 1968) was a senior Swedish Army officer.

Career
Gadd was born on 13 March 1885 in Malmö, Sweden, the son of Christoffer Gadd, a wholesaler, and his wife Augusta Lammers. Gadd was commissioned as an officer in 1906 and was assigned to Göta Artillery Regiment with the rank of underlöjtnant. He attended the Artillery and Engineering College from 1908 to 1909 and the Royal Swedish Army Staff College from 1913 to 1914. Gadd was then assigned to the General Staff as an officer aspirant from 1916 to 1918. In 1918, Gadd conducted a war history study trip to Kliszów, Poland. He became Captain of the General Staff in 1920 and served as a staff adjutant and then as a teacher at the Artillery and Engineering College from 1920 to 1928 when he was promoted to Major and appointed head of the General Staff's Organization Department.

In 1932, Gadd was promoted to Lieutenant Colonel of the General Staff and appointed senior adjutant. The same year he was appointed Vice Chief of the Military Office of the Land Defence (Lantförsvarets kommandoexpedition). In 1935, Gadd was promoted to Colonel and assumed the position of regimental commander of Wendes Artillery Regiment in Kristianstad. Gadd then served as Deputy Division Commander of the 1st Army Division (I. arméfördelningen) in Kristianstad and in 1942 he received the corresponding post as Deputy Military Commander of the I Military District. He was promoted to Major General in 1942 and served from 1943 to 1946 as Chief of the Army Staff and of the General Staff Corps, after which Gadd retired from the military. After his retirement, Gadd became chairman of the Swedish Women's Auxiliary Veterinary Corps (Svenska Blå Stjärnan) and its central board in 1949.

Personal life
In 1916, he married Margot Hill-Lindquist (1894–1944), the daughter of Herman Lindquist and Maggie Hill.

Death
Gadd died on 13 December 1968 in Stockholm. He was interred at Stadskyrkogården in Alingsås in 1969.

Dates of rank
1906 – Underlöjtnant
1912 – Lieutenant
1920 – Captain
1928 – Major
1932 – Lieutenant colonel
1935 – Colonel
1942 – Major general

Awards and decorations
Gadd's awards:

Swedish
  King Gustaf V's Jubilee Commemorative Medal (1928)
  Commander 1st Class of the Order of the Sword (15 November 1941)
  Knight of the Order of the Polar Star
  Knight of the Order of Vasa
  Swedish Voluntary Motor Transport Corps Medal of Merit in gold
 Landstormen Medal of Merit (Landstormens förtjänstmedalj)
 Swedish Red Cross Medal of Merit (Svenska Röda Korsets förtjänstmedalj)
 Swedish Women's Auxiliary Veterinary Corps Medal of Merit (Svenska Blå Stjärnans förtjänstmedalj)

Foreign
  Commander of the Order of the White Rose of Finland
  Commander Second Class of the Order of Polonia Restituta
  Officer of the Legion of Honour

Honours
Member of the Royal Swedish Academy of War Sciences (1930)

References

1885 births
1968 deaths
Swedish Army major generals
People from Malmö
20th-century Swedish military personnel
Members of the Royal Swedish Academy of War Sciences